John E. Lilley (born August 3, 1972) is an American retired professional ice hockey player.

Early life and education 
Lilley was born in Wakefield, Massachusetts. After graduating from Cushing Academy, where he set a new scoring record, he played college hockey for Boston University.

Career 
Drafted 140th overall by the Winnipeg Jets in the 1990 NHL Entry Draft, Lilley went on to play 23 games in the National Hockey League for the Mighty Ducks of Anaheim, scoring three goals and eight assists for 11 points and collecting 13 penalty minutes. He spent 3 seasons in Germany's Deutsche Eishockey Liga playing for Düsseldorfer EG, the Kassel Huskies and the Schwenninger Wild Wings. Lilley was on the American national team at the 1994 Winter Olympics in Lillehammer, Norway and played in the 1994 World Championship. He ended his career with the Long Beach Ice Dogs. He is the director of scouting and player development for the New York Rangers.

Career statistics

Regular season and playoffs

International

Awards and honors

References

External links
 

1972 births
American men's ice hockey right wingers
Boston University Terriers men's ice hockey players
Baltimore Bandits players
Detroit Vipers players
Düsseldorfer EG players
Ice hockey players from Massachusetts
Ice hockey players at the 1994 Winter Olympics
Kassel Huskies players
Living people
Long Beach Ice Dogs (WCHL) players
Los Angeles Ice Dogs players
Mighty Ducks of Anaheim players
Olympic ice hockey players of the United States
People from Wakefield, Massachusetts
Providence Bruins players
Rochester Americans players
San Diego Gulls (IHL) players
Schwenninger Wild Wings players
Seattle Thunderbirds players
Sportspeople from Middlesex County, Massachusetts
Toronto Maple Leafs scouts
Winnipeg Jets (1979–1996) draft picks